Chen Fashu (born 1961) is a Chinese billionaire businessman, chairman of New Huada Group, a Chinese mining company.

He was born in Fujian province, and graduated from China Europe International Business School.

As of July 2018, Forbes estimated his net worth at US$2.8 billion.

On May 9, 2009 Anheuser-Busch InBev sold its remaining 7% of Tsingtao Brewery to Chen Fashu for $235 million.

He is married, with four children, and lives in Fuzhou.

References

1961 births
Living people
Businesspeople from Fuzhou
Billionaires from Fujian
China Europe International Business School alumni